The Boomers are a Canadian rock band from Ontario.  Also known as The Boomers YYZ. Although their first album What We Do was not initially a commercial success in Canada, it became a cult hit in Germany, leading to a tour in 1991.  This success prompted the band to record The Art of Living; the single "You Gotta Know" was a hit in Canada.

Discography

References

Canadian pop rock music groups
Musical groups from Winnipeg
Musical groups established in 1991
Musical groups disestablished in 2002
1991 establishments in Manitoba
2002 disestablishments in Canada